The Sapthagiri Express (numbered:16057/16058) is an Express train, operated between  and .

It is regularly hauled by Arakkonam-based WAP-4 electric locomotive.

From Chennai Central to Tirupati Main the stops include Perambur, Ambattur,Tiruvallur, Arakkonam JN, Tiruttani, Ekkambarakuppam, Puttur and Renigunta JN.

The train is having Rake Share Arrangement with Train Number 16054/16053 Tirupathi - M.G.R Chennai Central - Tirupathi Express.

Running with ICF CBC Rake comprises 01 - AC ChairCar,06 - SecondSitting,09 - General SecondClass & 02 - SLR.

See also:

List of named passenger trains in India

References 

Transport in Chennai
Transport in Tirupati
Rail transport in Andhra Pradesh
Rail transport in Tamil Nadu